Space Chronicles: Facing the Ultimate Frontier is the 2012 anthology by Neil deGrasse Tyson covering his various writings relating to the history and future of NASA and space travel in general.

One of the chapters is a transcript of his attendance as a guest on the Rationally Speaking podcast in 2010, when he explained his justification for spending large amounts of government money on space programs.

Tyson intended the book's original title to be, Failure to Launch: The Dreams and Delusions of Space Enthusiasts.

References

American anthologies
2012 non-fiction books
Books by Neil deGrasse Tyson
Popular science books
W. W. Norton & Company books